The 1945 All-Southwest Conference football team consists of American football players chosen by various organizations for All-Southwest Conference teams for the 1945 college football season.  The selectors for the 1945 season included the Associated Press (AP) and United Press (UP).

All Southwest selections

Backs
 Bobby Layne, Texas (AP-1, UP-1 [fb])
 Bob Nemir, Rice (AP-1, UP-1 [qb])
 Doak Walker, SMU (AP-1, UP-1 [hb])
 Bob Goode, Texas A&M (AP-1, UP-1 [hb])

Ends
 Hub Bechtol, Texas (AP-1, UP-1)
 Gene Wilson, SMU (AP-1, UP-1)

Tackles
 Tom Dean, SMU (AP-1, UP-1)
 Monte Moncrief, Texas A&M (AP-1, UP-1)

Guards
 Nick Nicholson, Rice (AP-1, UP-1)
 Grant Darnell, Texas A&M (AP-1, UP-1)

Centers
 Dick Harris, Texas (AP-1, UP-1)

Key

See also
1945 College Football All-America Team

References

All-Southwest Conference
All-Southwest Conference football teams